My Family is a TVB modern drama series broadcast in January 2005.

Synopsis
Experience grows with age,
When wise old grand pa is in charge,
The family is in good shape.

Man Tai-Lor (Chung King Fai) controls the Man family with an iron fist, much to the displeasure of his son Man Chiu-Kit (Ha Yu), who is constantly trying to assert his authority within the family. When Tai-Lor developed Parkinson's disease, he hides his anxieties by retiring from his job as a school principal and concealing his ailment from his family. When the truth is revealed, he decides to step down as the patriarch of his family and lets Chiu-Kit run the family.

Relationships in the family worsen when eldest son Freeman Man Yat-Long (Hawick Lau) moves out. He and second son Ray Man Yat-Hei (Alex Fong) end up competing for the same girl, an aspiring cake maker named Miki Mo See-Ting (Shirley Yeung). The third son, Kevin Man Yat-Ching (Sam Chan) becomes especially rebellious as his father tries to assert himself as the family patriarch by implementing stricter and less reasonable rules for his sons to follow.  When the Man family starts teetering off the track, the old and retired Tai-Lor has to step in to clear the mess and gently guide everyone back...

Cast

Awards
Ha Yu won the "Best Actor in a Supporting Role" Award for his role Man Chiu-Kit, at the 38th TVB Anniversary Awards in 2005.

External links
TVB.com The Family - Official Website 

TVB dramas
2005 Hong Kong television series debuts
2005 Hong Kong television series endings
Hong Kong comedy television series